Peter Checkland (born 18 December 1930, in Birmingham, UK) is a British management scientist and emeritus professor of systems at Lancaster University. He is the developer of soft systems methodology (SSM): a methodology based on a way of systems thinking systems practice. Systems practice is the idea of uncovering an optimal solution within complex environments, thus leading to a thorough understanding of the system, analysing and adapting to change in the environment. In an important way his work preceded data science and change management disciplines in the next century.

Biography 
Checkland attended George Dixon's Grammar School, and in 1954 received a M.A. degree in chemistry at St John's College, Oxford, where he graduated with 1st class honours.

He worked in the industry for 15 years as a manager in ICI's chemicals business. At the end of the 1960s he joined the pioneering department of Systems Engineering at Lancaster University, where he became professor of Systems. At Lancaster he led a programme of action research. This research team developed a new way of tackling problem situations faced by managers – Soft Systems Methodology. The SSM approach is now used and taught worldwide. Since the 1990s he is Professor Emeritus of Systems in Lancaster University Management School.

Peter Checkland worked on the editorial board of journals such as European Journal of Information Systems; the International Journal of Information Management; the International Journal of General Systems; the Systems Practice; and the Systems Research journal.

In 1986 Peter Checkland was president of the Society for General Systems Research, now International Society for the Systems Sciences. In May 1996 he was awarded an honorary degree from the Open University as Doctor of the University. In 2004 he was awarded an honorary doctorate by the University of Economics, Prague. In 2007 he was awarded the Beale Medal by the OR Society, in recognition of his sustained and significant contribution to the philosophy, theory and practice of operational research. In 2008 he received the INCOSE Pioneer Award.

See also 
 Brian Wilson
 Rich picture

Publications 
Checkland wrote four books on Soft Systems Methodology and several articles and papers:

 1981, Systems Thinking, Systems Practice, Wiley [rev 1999 ed] 
 1990, Soft Systems in Action, Wiley (with Jim Scholes) [rev 1999 ed] 
 1998, Information, Systems and Information Systems, Wiley (with Sue Holwell) 
 2006, Learning For Action: A Short Definitive Account of Soft Systems Methodology, and its use Practitioners, Teachers and Students, Wiley (with John Poulter)

References

External links

 Professor Peter Checkland at Lancaster University, UK.
 Peter Checkland introduction by the Open University, UK.

1930 births
Academics of Lancaster University
Systems engineers
British systems scientists
Living people
People from Birmingham, West Midlands
Alumni of St John's College, Oxford
People educated at George Dixon Academy
Presidents of the International Society for the Systems Sciences